La Réserve de Beaulieu & Spa is a five-star hotel and spa in Beaulieu-sur-Mer, France. It is a member of The Leading Hotels of the World. It was bought in 1997 by Nicole and Jean-Claude Delion. The Delions also own La Résidence de la Pinède hotel in Saint-Tropez.

Historic guests have included Winston Churchill and Pablo Picasso.

References

1880 establishments in France
Buildings and structures in Alpes-Maritimes
French Riviera
Hotel buildings completed in 1880
Hotels in France
The Leading Hotels of the World